Staub (engl. dust, German and Jewish (Ashkenazic): from Middle High German stoup German Staub "dust" a nickname for a miller) is a German-language surname. Notable people with the surname include:

Chelsea Staub (born 1988), American actress and singer, now credited as Chelsea Kane
Ervin Staub (born 1938), Professor of Psychology at the University of Massachusetts
France Staub (1920–2005), ornithologist, herpetologist, botanist, and conservationist from Mauritius
Jacob Staub, rabbi, author and poet
John F. Staub (1892–1981), residential architect in Houston, Texas, from the 1920s to 1960s
Jonny Staub (born 1979), Canadian radio and television personality
Ralph Staub (1899–1969), movie director, writer and producer
Ralph Staub (football coach) (1928–2022), former head coach of the Cincinnati college football program
Randy Staub, Canadian recording engineer
Roger Staub (1936–1974), Swiss alpine skier
Rudolf Staub (1890–1961), Swiss geologist
Rusty Staub (1944–2018), retired Major League Baseball player
Wendy Corsi Staub (born 1964), author
Victor Staub (1872–1953), French pianist and composer

Staub (cookware) is also the name of a French cookware brand.

Occupational surnames
German-language surnames